Endoxocrinus is a genus of echinoderms belonging to the family Pentacrinitidae.

The species of this genus are found in Western Europe, America, Southeastern Asia and Australia.

Species:
Endoxocrinus alternicirrus 
Endoxocrinus maclearanus 
Endoxocrinus parrae 
Endoxocrinus sibogae 
Endoxocrinus wyvillethomsoni

References

Isselicrinidae
Crinoid genera